Francis Street may refer to:

 Francis Scott Street (1831–1883), co-owner of Street & Smith publishing company in New York City
 Francis Street (cricketer) (1851–1928), English cricketer